The De Profundis Stone is a recumbent stone located in the townland of Kilbride, County Westmeath, Ireland, near the town of Mullingar. The stone was possibly used to mark an ancient graveyard, as was sometimes customary in Ireland. The monument takes its name from a local tradition of stopping a funerary procession at the stone, and reciting the "De Profundis" (a colloquial name for Psalm 130 of the Old Testament). The Kilbride stone is the only known remaining example in Ireland at which this "De Profundis" tradition was performed.

The stone is made from limestone, and was shaped into a "coffin-like" shape with a crude cross carved into the top. The stone is approximately 0.94m in length.

Notes and references

	

Archaeological sites in County Westmeath